Uttam Kunwar (1938–1982) was a Nepalese literary journalist, critic, and writer. He served as an editor for Ruprekha, one of the most popular literary magazine in Nepal, alongside Bal Mukunda Pandey. He won the Madan Puraskar in 1966 (2023 BS) for his book Srasta ra Sahitya, an anthology of literary interviews.

Biography 
He was born on 25 May 1938 (12 Jestha 1995 BS) in Chhetrapati, Kathmandu to father Janga Bahadur Kunwar and mother Bhagwati Kunwar. He obtained an IA degree in veterinary. He then ventured into the world of journalism. He worked as the editor of the Nepali literary magazine, Ruprekha. During his editorship, the magazine became widely popular. In 1966, he published Srasta ra Sahitya, a book of literary interviews with prominent Nepali writers such as Bhupi Sherchan, Parijat (writer), Madhav Prasad Ghimire,etc. He conducted those interviews form 1961 to 1996. The book earned him the prestigious Madan Puraskar for the same year.

He died on 30 July 1982 (15 Shrawan 2039 BS), of a cardiac arrest in his home at the age of 44.

Notable works 

 Srasta ra Sahitya (1966, Literary interview)
 Anubhav ra Anubhuti (Collection of essays)
 Sir Henry Lawrence ko Jiwani (Biography of Sir Henry Lawrence)

Legacy 
A literary foundation called Uttam Kunwar Memorial Award Trust was founded in his honor by his wife, Shanti Kunwar. The trust presents a award known as Uttam Shanti Puraskar every year to a non-fiction book in Nepali language. Prominent writers like Saru Bhakta, Ram Prasad Panta, Sarita Aryal, etc. have been felicitated with the award.

See also 

 Riddhi Bahadur Malla
 Bhawani Bhikshu
 Shankar Lamichhane

References

Further reading 

 Interviews by Uttam Kunwar from the book Srasta ra Sahitya translated into English

20th-century Nepalese writers
Nepalese literary critics
1938 births
1982 deaths
Madan Puraskar winners
Nepalese non-fiction writers
Nepalese journalists
Nepalese male writers
Nepali-language writers
Nepali-language writers from Nepal
Khas people